Breakout or Break Out may refer to:

Narratives
 Breakout character
 Breakthrough role, also known as a "breakout role"

Television
 Breakout (Singaporean TV series), a 2010–2011 Singaporean TV drama broadcast by MediaCorp Channel 8
 Breakout (Canadian TV program), a 2010–2013 Canadian documentary television program dramatizing real life prison breakouts that aired on National Geographic Channel
 Breakout, an Indonesian NET music program
 "Breakout" (Joe 90), a 1969 episode of Joe 90
 "Breakout" (The Avengers: Earth's Mightiest Heroes), the first episode of the animated TV series, The Avengers: Earth's Mightiest Heroes
 "Breakout", two episodes of Lego Hero Factory

Film
 Danger Within, a 1959 British film retitled Breakout for the U.S. market
 Break Out (film), a 2002 South Korean film
 Breakout (1959 film), a British drama film
 Breakout (1970 film), an American TV film which broadcast on NBC
 Breakout (1975 film), a film starring Charles Bronson and Robert Duvall
 Breakout (1997 film), a British television film starring Neil Dudgeon and Samantha Bond

Music 
 Breakout (band), a Polish blues/rock band

Albums
 Breakout (Spyro Gyra album), 1986
 Breakout (Miley Cyrus album), 2008
 Breakout (Johnny Hammond album), 1971
 Break Out (Pointer Sisters album), 1983
 Breakout (Swing Out Sister album), 2001
 Break Out (Soulive album), 2005

 Breakout...!!!, by Mitch Ryder & The Detroit Wheels, 1966

Songs
 "Breakout" (Swing Out Sister song), 1986
 "Breakout" (Foo Fighters song), 2000 
 "Breakout" (Miley Cyrus song), 2008
 "Breakout" (Cryoshell song), 2012
 "Breakout", by Black Sabbath from Never Say Die!
 "Breakout", by Sean Paul from The Trinity
 "Breakout", by Bon Jovi from Bon Jovi
 "Breakout", by Ratt from Ratt
 "Breakout", by Ace Frehley from Frehley's Comet

 "Breakout", from the first act of Lord of the Dance

 "Breakout", by Margaret Durante from Shake It Up: Break It Down soundtrack
 "Break Out", 1966 single by Mitch Ryder & The Detroit Wheels
 "Break Out", 1968 single by Dave Dee, Dozy, Beaky, Mick & Tich
 "Break Out", 1968 song by Normie Rowe
 "Break Out!, 1996 song by Nanase Aikawa
"Break Out!" (Tohoshinki song), 2010

Electronics 
 Breakout board, hardware that allows hand-access to densely spaced pins on a microchip
 Breakout box, an electrical device that separates individual signal paths in a multi-conductor input connector into separate connectors

Gaming
 Breakout (video game),  an influential 1976 arcade game by Atari, and later home versions
 Breakout clone, a video game with gameplay similar to the original Breakout
 Breakout (magazine), a gaming magazine first published in 1981

Slang 
 Breakout, slang for a prison escape
 Breakout, a North American slang term for acne vulgaris

Other uses 
 Breakout (military), a military operation to end a situation of encirclement or siege
 Breakout (technical analysis), when prices pass through, and stay through an area of support or resistance
 Breakout session or breakout room, when participants in a meeting change from a plenary session to choices of workshop sessions

See also

 Breakout Creek, Adelaide, South Australia
 
 
 Outbreak (disambiguation)
 Break (disambiguation)
 Out (disambiguation)